Motes Creek is a  long 3rd order tributary to the Haw River, in Alamance County, North Carolina.

Course
Motes Creek rises on the divide between it and Cane Creek, about 4 miles northeast of Saxapahaw in Alamance County, North Carolina and then flows east to the Haw River at Saxapahaw, North Carolina.

Watershed
Motes Creek drains  of area, receives about 46.5 in/year of precipitation, and has a wetness index of 423.14 and is about 39% forested.

See also
List of rivers of North Carolina

References

Additional Maps

Rivers of North Carolina
Rivers of Alamance County, North Carolina